Woodford is a historic mansion at Ford Road and Greenland Drive in Fairmount Park, Philadelphia, Pennsylvania.  Built about 1756, it is the first of Philadelphia's great colonial Georgian mansion houses to be built, and exemplifies the opulence of such houses.  A National Historic Landmark, it now a historic house museum open to the public.

History
Built from 1756 to 1758, Woodford is the first of the great, opulent, late-Georgian mansions to be erected in the Philadelphia area.

Upon Coleman's death in 1769, the house was sold to Alexander Barclay, a Quaker who served as His Majesty's Customs Comptroller for the port of Philadelphia.

Upon Barclay's death in 1771, the house was bought by his brother-in-law, David Franks, who in 1772 added a second story and a kitchen wing, enlarging the house to almost its present size.

In 1778, Franks, a staunch loyalist, was arrested and ordered to leave. He took his family to New York City, and transferred the property to Thomas Paschall in settlement of a debt. Paschall is believed never to have lived at the house, but rented it out. He sold it to Isaac Wharton in 1793.

In 1869, the city bought Woodford from Wharton's heirs to add to Fairmount Park. The house served as the home of the Park's Chief Engineer and Supervisor, and later, in 1912, as the Park Guard headquarters and traffic court.

The building was restored, commencing in 1927, and in 1930, it was opened to the public as a house museum, which it remains today. It houses, under the direction of the Naomi Wood Trust, the Naomi Wood collection of antique household goods, including Colonial furniture, unusual clocks, and English delftware.

Woodford was designated a National Historic Landmark in 1967. It is a contributing property of the Fairmount Park Historic District.

See also

 List of houses in Fairmount Park
 List of National Historic Landmarks in Philadelphia
 National Register of Historic Places listings in North Philadelphia

References

External links

Listing at the Fairmount Park Commission
Listing at Philadelphia Architects and Buildings

Historic Photographs of Woodford, PhillyHistory.org

Houses on the National Register of Historic Places in Philadelphia
Historic American Buildings Survey in Philadelphia
National Historic Landmarks in Pennsylvania
Historic house museums in Philadelphia
Decorative arts museums in the United States
Art museums and galleries in Pennsylvania
Philadelphia Register of Historic Places
Historic district contributing properties in Pennsylvania
Georgian architecture in Pennsylvania
Houses completed in 1756
Houses in Fairmount Park
East Fairmount Park